"California Man" is a song by British rock and roll band The Move. It was written by the band's guitarist/vocalist Roy Wood, who has said he wrote it as a pastiche of Little Richard (Wood's favorite musician of the time) and Jerry Lee Lewis (Move pianist/guitarist/vocalist Jeff Lynne's favorite musician at the time).

Release
Though the band's popularity would continue to be milked with bootleg singles throughout the 1970s, this was The Move's last officially released single. It was released in April 1972, bearing "Do Ya" and "Ella James" as a double B-side. A pastiche of Jerry Lee Lewis, Little Richard and Larry Williams, the composition is recorded in a high-energy rock and roll style, with lead vocals by both Wood and Jeff Lynne, who were at the time jointly leaders of both the Electric Light Orchestra (ELO) and The Move. "California Man" reached number 7 on the UK Singles Chart in May 1972. The ELO issued its first single, "10538 Overture", a month after this track.

In the U.S., "California Man" was issued on the United Artists record label. It was flipped after release, when Lynne's "Do Ya" B-side proved more popular. It became The Move's only U.S. charting single, peaking at number 93 on the Billboard Hot 100 in November 1972. Only Wood, Lynne and drummer Bev Bevan appear on the recording. The picture sleeve has an older picture of The Move, including bassist Rick Price, who was no longer a member of the group by then. None of the Move's albums included the song in their original release; however, it does appear as a bonus track on the reissue of Message from the Country.

A live vocal performance of the song survives from a 22 June 1972 repeat episode of BBC's Top of the Pops.

"Ella James"
"Ella James" was a song written by Roy Wood and taken from the band's final album Message from the Country.

It was first released as a single in the UK in 1971, with "No Time" from the same album on the B-side, but was quickly withdrawn in favour of "Tonight". When it was again released as a single in 1972, it was the B-side of "California Man" along with "Do Ya".

Wood has cited "Ella James" as one of his favorite songs to emerge from the collaboration between him and Jeff Lynne, along with Lynne's composition "The Minister". The song was later covered by The Nashville Teens.

Covers
"California Man" was later covered by Cheap Trick, who included it on their 1978 album Heaven Tonight and also released it as a single that year to follow up "Surrender". The Cheap Trick version incorporated an instrumental break based on the riff from another Move song, "Brontosaurus".  Cash Box praised its "pounding rock 'n' roll beat and excellent guitar work by Rick Nielsen." Roy Wood has said that he likes Cheap Trick's rendition of the song. It has also been included on several Cheap Trick compilation albums. 

Cliff Richard has performed it live on occasion, as has Italian glam rock band Giuda. Drake Bell covered the song on the 2014 album Ready, Steady, Go!. Comedian Jim Davidson covered it on his 1985 LP The Jim Davidson Album. Ryan Roxie has covered the song as well on the 2018 album Imagine Your Reality with Cheap Trick singer Robin Zander adding a guest vocal appearance.

References

External links
  (from Gastank, Episode 6, 1983)

Song recordings produced by Jeff Lynne
Song recordings produced by Roy Wood
The Move songs
1972 songs
Songs written by Roy Wood
Cheap Trick songs
1972 singles
1978 singles
Song recordings produced by Tom Werman
Harvest Records singles
Cliff Richard songs
Epic Records singles
United Artists Records singles